Earnshaw State College is a P-12 college in the Brisbane North Education District. Established in 2003 and located in Queensland, Australia in the suburb of Banyo in northeast Brisbane. Earnshaw has a short history as a College but a long history in Nudgee State School and Banyo State High School. Earnshaw specialises in Business.

Teams of Earnshaw students from grades 10, 11 and 12 won the 2010, 2011, and 2012 Global Enterprise Challenge.

Sporting houses
 Bradman
 Named after: Donald Bradman
 Colour: blue
 O'Neill
 Named after: Susie O'Neill
 Colour: green

 Rafter
 Named after: Patrick Rafter
 Colour: red

Notable alumni
Leanne Linard, Member for the Queensland seat of Nudgee and is Minister for Children and Youth Justice and Minister for Multicultural Affairs in the Palaszczuk Government

References

Public high schools in Brisbane
Educational institutions established in 2003
2003 establishments in Australia